Paolo Pandolfo is an Italian virtuoso player, composer, and teacher of music for the viola da gamba, born on January 31, 1964.

He began his studies as a double bass and guitar player, becoming a skilled performer of jazz and popular music. In the mid-late 1970s he studied viola da gamba at the Rome Conservatory. In 1979 he co-founded the early music ensemble La Stravaganza, and then moved to Basel, Switzerland in 1981 where he studied with Jordi Savall at the Schola Cantorum Basiliensis. From 1982 to 1990 Pandolfo was a member of Jordi Savall's early music groups Hespèrion XX.

Since 1989 Pandolfo has served as professor of viola da gamba at the Schola Cantorum Basiliensis — a position previously held by maestros August Wenzinger and Jordi Savall. He also directs, records, and performs regularly with his viola da gamba-oriented early music ensemble Labyrinto, which he co-founded.

Pandolfo has recorded numerous CDs. For most of the 1980s he recorded primarily with Jordi Savall and others. His first recording as a soloist was in 1990 with the release of his highly acclaimed CD C. P. E. Bach: Sonatas for Viola da Gamba (Tactus). He has also recorded a viola da gamba interpretation of the cello suites of J. S. Bach. Pandolfo explains that the suites, although written for the cello, were conceived in the polyphonic style of the viola da gamba; further, the dance suite was a common form for viola da gamba music, and playing the Bach suites on the gamba is thus a way to reclaim this tradition for the viola da gamba.

Pandolfo has said that the patrimony of ancient music can be a powerful inspiration for the future of the Western musical tradition. Building bridges between past and present is therefore an important part of his work.

Discography
C. P. E. Bach: Sonatas for Viola da Gamba (Tactus)
Forqueray - Pièces de viole avec la basse continuë (integrale, Glossa; 2 CDs)
J. S. Bach - Sonatas for Viola da Gamba and harpsichord (Harmonia Mundi)
Marin Marais - Le Labyrinth et autres Histoires (Glossa)
Marin Marais - Le Grand Ballet (Glossa)
J. S. Bach - The Six Suites (Glossa)
Tobias Hume - Spirit of Gambo (Glossa - Labyrinto, Emma Kirkby)
Le Sieur de St. Colombe - Pieces de Viole (Glossa)
A Solo - P. Pandolfo, T. Hume, Corkins, DeMachy, M. Marais, J. S. Bach, C. F. Abel - solo Recital with different Authors (Glossa)
Io Canterei d'Amor - O. diLasso, T. Crequillon, Arcadelt, D. Ortiz, R. Rogniono, A. Gabrieli (Labirinto V. Ruffo - Harmonia Mundi)
Travel Notes - New music for the Viola da Gamba composed by Paolo Pandolfo (Glossa)
Improvisando - (Glossa)
Heinrich Isaac, La Spagna - Includes D. Ortiz - Variations on La Spagna played by P. Pandolfo (Bongiovanni)
Canzon del Principe (includes Oratio Bassani's Viola Bastarda solos - solos by Oratio Bassani played by P. Pandolfo (Divox Antiqua)

Pandolfo is also a contributing performer on dozens of other recordings, collaborating with various well known artists, including:
Jordi Savall — Hespèrion XX and Hespèrion XXI (numerous titles)

References

External links
Paolo Pandolfo interview
Paolo Pandolfo's official web site

Italian performers of early music
Viol players
Living people
Year of birth missing (living people)
Musicians from Basel-Stadt
Place of birth missing (living people)
Academic staff of Schola Cantorum Basiliensis